The Corimelaeninae are a subfamily of shield bugs within the family Thyreocoridae. It has often been treated as a family (e.g.), but the name Thyreocoridae, published in 1843, has nomenclatural priority over Corimelaenidae, published in 1872.

References

Shield bugs